Nanularia pygmaea is a species of metallic wood-boring beetle in the family Buprestidae. It is found in North America.

References

Further reading

 
 
 

Buprestidae
Articles created by Qbugbot
Beetles described in 1941